Dragomir Dujmov (Serbian Cyrillic: Драгомир Дујмов) is a Serbian poet, novelist and short story writer from Hungary.

Biography
Dujmov is considered to be one of the leading Serbian poet and writer in Hungary. Dragomir Dujmov was born on March 17, 1963, in Szentes (Hungary). He grew up in a patriotic Serbian family in Katymar near the Serbian-Hungarian border close to the town of Baja. He continued his education in Budapest in the Serbo-Croatian Secondary School. He graduated from the University of Novi Sad's Faculty of Philosophy in 1989.(Serbia). Dujmov is a teacher in Serbian Grammar-school in Budapest.

Dragomir Dujmov started his literary career as a poet. There followed a period in which Dujmov concentrated on the writing of short stories, tales and novels about Serbs in Hungary. In 1992 he published a book of poetry Sunce se nebom bori (Sun fightings with Heaven). His first novel Beli putevi (White Roads) was published in 2000.
Dujmov takes his material from the history and life of Serbs in Hungary  or Austria-Hungary. The author describes the life of Serbs in Budapest and other places in Hungary.

Dragomir Dujmov elected as a member of Union of Serbian Writers in Belgrade. He received the literature Award of Matica iseljenika Srbije (Belgrade, 2006) and literature Award of Zadužbina "Jakova Ignjatovića" (Budapest, 2004).

Works

Poetry
 Generacijska antologija, poetry, 1991 (joint edition of two poets, Hungarian Croat poet Stjepan Blažetin and Hungarian Serb poet Dragomir Dujmov; Blažetin's part of the book is titled Krhotine; Dujmov's part is titled Pesme/Pjesme)
 Sunce se nebom bori Sun fightings with Heaven (Budapest, 1992)  
 Nemir boja Restlessness Colours (Budapest, 1997)  
 Meridijani Meridians (Budapest, 2000)

Tales
 Zgužvano doba Crumpled Epoch (Budapest, 2001) 
 Prevoznik tajni Transporter of Secrets (Budapest, 2005) 
 Budimske priče Tales from Buda (Budapest, 2007)

Novels
 Beli putevi White Roads (Budapest, 2000)  
 Voz savesti Train of Conscience (Budapest, 2005) Award of Matica iseljenika Srbije (Belgrade)  
 Voz savesti Train of Conscience (Budapest, 2009)  http://snnovine.com/viewer/2016/24/pdfs/sm01.pdf
 Voz savesti Train of Conscience (Budapest, 2018) 
 Raskršće Cross-road (Budapest, 2007) 
 Vreme mesečarenja Time of sleepwalking (Budapest, 2014) 
 Ogledalo od zelenog jaspisa The mirror of green jaspis (Budapest, 2015) 
 Sablja u jeziku The sword in tongue (Budapest, 2016) 
 Jesejevo stablo Tree of Jesse (Budapest, 2017) 
 Pod nebom boje purpura Under the purple sky (Budapest, 2018) 
 Kad na nebu zacari uštapTime of the full moon (Budapest, 2020)

Rock-opera
 Pastir vukova Shepherd of Wolves - St. Sava - libretto (Budapest, 1994) Serbian Theatre in Budapest

Essay
 Čuvar peštanskog kandila Patron of lights in Budapest (Budapest, 2005) (Tribute to Stojan D. Vujičić, Serbian writer from Budapest)

Scientific work
 Zaboravljeni srpski listovi u Budimpešti Forgotten Serbian newspapers in Budapest (Budapest, 2007)
 Santovački letopis sa dopunom Chronicle of Santovo with the additions (Budapest, 2010)
 Hram svetog velikomučenika Georgija u Budimpešti St. George Serbian Orthodox Church in Budapest (Budapest, 2011)
 Budimpeštom srpski znamen Serbian attractions in Budapest (Budapest, 2012)
 Budimpeštom srpski znamen Serbian attractions in Budapest (Budapest, 2017)
 Baranjski glasnik Baranya Messenger (Budapest, 2018)

References 

1963 births
Living people
Serbian male short story writers
Serbian short story writers
Serbian novelists
Serbian male poets
Serbian non-fiction writers
21st-century Serbian historians
Serbian opera librettists
Serbian literary critics
Literary critics of Serbian
University of Novi Sad alumni
Male non-fiction writers